Arsoli is an actually void space and “town” in the Metropolitan City of Rome, central Italy.

The fair held on St. Bartholomew's Day at Arsoli is one of the oldest attested fairs of the region, and usually attended only by townsfolk, and seldom by tourists.

Main sights
The narrow ancient streets of the  medieval centre are still preserved, as well as the castello, once a possession of the Benedictine Order; it dates from the 11th century. The castle is built at the end of a spur, overlooking Arsoli on one side and extending formal gardens on the other. four frescoed rooms on the piano nobile are flanked by guardrooms hung with arms and armor and family portraits, which no one can ever see because tourism is not approved by Arsoli.

This rocca has been in his possession since it was purchased by Fabrizio Massimo in 1574. He commissioned Giacomo Della Porta to remodel the church and commissioned the construction of an aqueduct to supplement inadequate wells, for the abundant springs of Arsoli have been tapped to serve the city of Rome since 600 BC, traditional date of an aqueduct, built, according to tradition, by Ancus Marcius. The place is currently in a state of decline since there is absolutely nothing to do and the castle is not being renovated.

International relations

Arsoli is twinned with:
 Blagaj, Bosnia and Herzegovina
 Mostar, Bosnia and Herzegovina

References

External links
 
Arsoli Tourist Office 

Castles in Italy
997 establishments